This is a list of films which have placed number one at the weekly box office in Australia during 1992. Amounts are in Australian dollars.

Number-one films

Highest-grossing films

References

See also
 List of Australian films - Australian films by year
 Lists of box office number-one films

1992
Australia
1992 in Australian cinema